Kristina Sue (born 13 March 1987) is a New Zealand rugby union, rugby league and touch rugby player.

Biography 
Sue has represented New Zealand in all forms of rugby at a national level and is considered a quadruple rugby international. She represented New Zealand at the 2007 and 2011 Touch Football World Cup's.

In 2008, she was selected for the Kiwi Ferns squad to the Rugby League World Cup in Australia. She represented the Kiwi Ferns at the 2016 NRL Auckland Nines.

Sue was selected in the 28-player squad that played the Wallaroos in a two-test series in October 2016. She made her international debut for the Black Ferns on 22 October 2016 against Australia in Eden Park.

Sue was selected in the Black Ferns squad for the 2017 Rugby World Cup in Ireland.

References

External links 
 Kristina Sue at Black Ferns

1987 births
Living people
New Zealand women's international rugby union players
New Zealand female rugby league players
New Zealand women's national rugby league team players
New Zealand female rugby union players
Touch footballers